ISO 3166-2:IQ is the entry for Iraq in ISO 3166-2, part of the ISO 3166 standard published by the International Organization for Standardization (ISO), which defines codes for the names of the principal subdivisions (e.g., provinces or states) of all countries coded in ISO 3166-1.

Currently for Iraq, ISO 3166-2 codes are defined for 18 governorates and 1 region.

Each code consists of two parts, separated by a hyphen. The second part is two letters.

Current codes
Subdivision names are listed as in the ISO 3166-2 standard published by the ISO 3166 Maintenance Agency (ISO 3166/MA).

Changes
The following changes to the entry are listed on ISO's online catalogue, the Online Browsing Platform:

See also
 Subdivisions of Iraq
 FIPS region codes of Iraq

External links
 ISO Online Browsing Platform: IQ
 UN/LOCODE Country Subdivisions ISO 3166-2
 Provinces of Iraq, Statoids.com

2:IQ
ISO 3166-2
Iraq geography-related lists